Cecil Warner (23 May 1897 – 4 April 1983) was a South African cricketer. He played in three first-class matches for Border in 1929/30 and 1930/31.

See also
 List of Border representative cricketers

References

External links
 

1897 births
1983 deaths
South African cricketers
Border cricketers